The 1981 Giro d'Italia was the 64th edition of the Giro d'Italia, one of cycling's Grand Tours. The field consisted of 130 riders, and 104 riders finished the race.

By rider

By nationality

References

1981 Giro d'Italia
1981